Year 1163 (MCLXIII) was a common year starting on Tuesday (link will display the full calendar) of the Julian calendar.

Events 
 Owain Gwynedd is recognized as ruler of Wales.
 Silesian duchies accept the suzerainty of the Holy Roman Empire.
 The Law of Succession is introduced in Norway.
 Council of Tours: Albigensians are named and condemned as heretics.
 Loccum Abbey in Hanover is founded as a Cistercian house, by Cornwall.
 The Guanfuchang salt-fields (官富場) in Hong Kong (nowadays To Kwa Wan, Kowloon Bay, Kwun Tong and Lam Tin districts) are first officially operated by the Song dynasty.
 The first stone of Paris's Notre Dame Cathedral is set by Pope Alexander III.
 The Thousand Pillar Temple is constructed by Rudra Deva in India.
 The Notre-Dame Cathedral is laid in the reign of Louis VII in Paris, France

Births 
 Ban Kulin, ruler of Bosnia (d. 1204)
 Canute VI of Denmark (d. 1202)
 Ottokar IV of Styria (d. 1192)
 Hōjō Yoshitoki, Kamakura regent (d. 1224)
 As-Salih Ismail al-Malik, ruler of Syria (d. 1181)
 Ibn al-Qabisi (d. 1235)

Deaths 
 January 14 – King Ladislaus II of Hungary (b. 1131)
 February 10 – King Baldwin III of Jerusalem (b. 1130)
 date unknown
Constance of Antioch, ruler of Antioch (b. 1127)  - or possibly early 1164
 Abd al-Mu'min, founder of the Almohad Empire (b. 1094)
 Dahui Zonggao, Chinese Zen Buddhist monk (b. 1089)

References